This is the filmography of American voice actor, producer and screenwriter Yuri Lowenthal.

Voice-over filmography

Anime

Animation

Direct-to-video and television films

Feature films

Video games

Other voice-over roles

Live-action filmography

Television

Film

Notes

References

Citations

Book sources

External links
 
 Yuri Lowenthal at Crystal Acids Voice Actor Database
 

Male actor filmographies
American filmographies